Fernando Paillet (27 October 1880 – 3 November 1967), was an Argentine photographer that portrayed the colonisation and life of the settlers in Esperanza, an agricultural colony founded in 1856 in Santa Fe Province (Argentina). Paillet defined himself as a "provincial photographer that recorded the pampa gringa".

Paillet is considered one of the most notable photographers of the first half of the 20th century.

Biography
Named Fernando Basilio Paillet, he was son of Clotilde Insinger, granddaughter of Peter Zimmerman, the first colony that died in Esperanza. Paillet started with photography at a very early age, becoming an employee of the Lutser studio of Santa Fe in 1898. In 1899 Paillet acquired his first camera, a Widmayer, and returned to his born town.

At the beginning of the twentieth century he established in Esperanza to work as photographer. He opened his own studio in 1902, continuing his career until 1950. Paillet became the most renowned photographer of the city, recording its traditions and landscapes with his camera. He a wide range of people such as majors, police chiefs, judges, ladies of charity and other anonymous personalities.

Their hardiness seems an extreme way of fineness today. Bucolic, gallant, laborious, agricultural, metallurgic scenes; all of them take us to lost tabernacles where the history of the Argentine colonization lays today. The history of crafts, the history of the familiar romance and the history of photography itself".|Horacio González, director of National Library of Argentina

Paillet was also a painter, violinist and directed the chorus of the Singing Society. He wrote four songs that include a tango and a vals, and a theatre play.

In 1948 the municipality of Esperanza committed Paillet the creation of a historic and art museum. He started to job with his nephew Rogelio Imhoff, producing a considerable amount of images. Nevertheless, the project was never carried out, which caused a strong depression on Paillet. As a result, he destroyed the 80% of the photographs taken. Only about 200 were preserved from destruction.

Due to a progressive deafness, Paillet spent his last years with small activities. He died in 1967.

Books 
 Fernando Paillet: Fotografías 1894–1940, published by Fundación Antorchas, 2015

References

External links 

 Museo Paillet
 "Paillet: la vida es bella", poems based on Paillet's photographs

Argentine photographers
1880 births
1967 deaths
People from Esperanza, Santa Fe